The Looping Starship is an amusement ride manufactured by Intamin of Switzerland. The ride is a swinging ship that can spin a complete 360-degree revolution.
The ride has been modified with custom theming to resemble a number of different vehicles, including a Space Shuttle, a fighter jet, an Egyptian cargo ship, and a Looney Tunes ACME Rocket.

The Looping Starship is manufactured either as a traveling model or a park model.

Locations

Existing Looping Starships

Removed

References

External links 
 Intamin Looping Starship

Pendulum rides
Upside-down amusement rides